The semipalmated sandpiper (Calidris pusilla) is a very small shorebird. The genus name is from Ancient Greek kalidris or skalidris, a term used by Aristotle for some grey-coloured waterside birds. The specific pusilla is Latin for "very small".

It is sometimes separated with other "stints" in Erolia, but, although these apparently form a monophyletic group, the present species' old genus Ereunetes had been proposed before Erolia.

Description
It is a small sandpiper, 13–15 cm (5.1-5.9 in) long and weighing around 20-32 g (0.7-1.1 oz). Wingspan ranges from 13.8-14.6 in (35-37 cm). Adults have black legs and a short, stout, straight dark bill. The body is dark grey-brown on top and white underneath. The head and neck are tinged light grey-brown. This bird can be difficult to distinguish from other similar tiny shorebirds, in particular the western sandpiper; these are known collectively as "peeps" or "stints".

Breeding and habitat
Their breeding habitat is the southern tundra in Canada and Alaska near water. They nest on the ground. The male makes several shallow scrapes; the female chooses one and adds grass and other material to line the nest. The female lays 4 eggs; the male assists in incubation. After a few days, the female leaves the young with the male; the young feed themselves.

These birds forage on mudflats, picking up food by sight and feel (bill). They mainly eat aquatic insects and their larvae, spiders, snails, worms and crustaceans. Semipalmated sandpipers rely heavily on horseshoe crab eggs during spring migration. Females will also eat small mammal bones as an extra source of calcium during egg laying.

Status and migration
They are long distance migrants and winter in coastal South America, with some going to the southern United States and the Caribbean. They migrate in flocks which can number in the hundreds of thousands, particularly in favoured feeding locations such as the Bay of Fundy and Delaware Bay. This species is a rare but regular vagrant to western Europe.

Although very numerous, these birds are highly dependent on a few key stopover habitats during their migration, notably Mary's Point and Johnson's Mills along Shepody Bay, an arm of the Bay of Fundy. During the months of July and August, the Nature Conservancy of Canada runs an information center about these shorebirds in Johnson's Mills, New Brunswick.

References

Further reading

Identification
 Jonsson, Lars & Peter J. Grant (1984) Identification of stints and peeps British Birds 77(7):293-315

External links

 Semipalmated sandpiper species sccount - Cornell Lab of Ornithology
 Semipalmated sandpiper - Calidris pusilla - USGS Patuxent Bird Identification InfoCenter
 Johnson's Mills Shorebird Reserve and Interpretive Centre
 An online identification article covering this species and other small calidrids at surfbirds.com
 
 
 
 Semipalmated sandpiper - BirdLife International

Native birds of Alaska
Birds of Canada
Birds of Hispaniola
Birds of the Dominican Republic
Calidris
Erolia
Sandpipers
Migratory birds (Western Hemisphere)
Birds described in 1766
Taxa named by Carl Linnaeus